The Russian Party (RS) is a political party in Serbia representing the Russian minority. In addition to the small Russian minority, the party also gathers a large number of pro-Russian citizens, mostly Serbs. The party's president is Slobodan Nikolić, a former vice president of the People's Peasant Party.

Program 
According to its program, the Russian Party advocates Serbia's entry into the Eurasian Economic Union, and the full membership of Serbia in the Collective Security Treaty Organization. The party also advocates increasing cooperation with the Russian Federation in the field of economy, culture and education.

Electoral performance

Parliamentary elections

Presidential elections

References 

Eurosceptic parties in Serbia
Political parties established in 2013
Political parties of minorities in Serbia
Russian diaspora in Serbia
Russian diaspora political parties